Shadmehr (also Romanized as Shādmehr; also known as Shādmir and Shalimar) is a city and capital of Shadmehr District, in Mahvelat County, Razavi Khorasan Province, Iran. At the 2006 census, its population was 3,369, in 848 families.

References 

Populated places in Mahvelat County
Cities in Razavi Khorasan Province